Arevik (formerly, Agdzharkh and Aghja-Arkh) is a town in the Armavir province of Armenia. The name Arevik comes from the root Arev meaning "sun".

See also 
Armavir Province

References 

World Gazeteer: Armenia – World-Gazetteer.com

Populated places in Armavir Province
Yazidi populated places in Armenia